Nachos are a Mexican snack food named after its inventor Nacho Anaya.

Nacho may also refer to:

Name
 Nacho (given name), including a list of people with the name or nickname
 Nacho (footballer, born 1967), Spanish footballer José Ignacio Fernández Palacios
 Nacho (footballer, born 1980), Spanish footballer Ignacio Pérez Santamaría
 Nacho (footballer, born 1989), Spanish footballer José Ignacio Martínez García
 Nacho (footballer, born 1990), Spanish footballer José Ignacio Fernández Iglesias
 Nacho (footballer, born 1993), Spanish footballer Ignacio Agustín Sánchez Romo
 Nacho (singer), Venezuelan singer Miguel Ignacio Mendoza Donatti (born 1983)

Film and television
Nacho (telenovela), a Venezuelan television show
Nacho, a 2023 Spanish TV series
"Nacho" (Better Call Saul), an episode of Better Call Saul
Nacho Varga, a fictional character in Better Call Saul
Nacho, the main character in the 2006 film Nacho Libre, played by Jack Black
Nacho Reyes, a fictional character in Carlito's Way: Rise to Power, played by Luis Guzmán

Other uses
North American Conference of Homophile Organizations
Not Another Completely Heuristic Operating System
Nacho, Arunachal Pradesh, India, a village
Nacho (Vidhan Sabha constituency), an Indian constituency

See also 

 Nacho cheese, a Doritos flavor
 Nacho cheese, a processed cheese dip